Fishtë is a settlement in the former Blinisht municipality, in Lezhë County, northwestern Albania. At the 2015 local government reform it became part of the municipality Lezhë. It is an important agritourism area with a number of well established slow food restaurants.

Notable people
Gjergj Fishta, Albanian national poet

References

Populated places in Lezhë
Villages in Lezhë County